The 2008 Campeonato Nacional Apertura Copa Banco Estado  was the 83rd Chilean League top flight, in which Everton won its 4th league title after beating Colo-Colo in the finals. The 20 teams were organized into four groups, but played each other in a single round-robin format. The top-two teams from each group advanced to a single elimination play-off, but the best 3rd-place team had to worst 2nd-place team in an advancement play-off match.

First stage

Results

Table

Group standings

Group 1

Group 2

Group 3

Group 4

Play-off match

Playoff stage
The clubs were seeded by their first phase standings.

Finals

Everton qualified to the 2009 Copa Libertadores Second Stage.

Top-five goalscorers

External links
 RSSSF Chile 2008

Primera División de Chile seasons
Chile
Prim